From the 13th Sun is the seventh studio album by Swedish doom metal band Candlemass, released in 1999. The CD liner notes say it is "dedicated to the greatest band of all time: Black Sabbath".

Track listing
All songs written by Leif Edling, except where noted.
 "Droid" - 4:35
 "Tot" – 6:01
 "Elephant Star" – 4:54
 "Blumma Apt" (Edling, Björn Flodkvist) – 5:23 
 "ARX/NG 891" (Edling, Carl Westholm) – 5:56 
 "Zog" – 5:52
 "Galatea" – 4:49
 "Cyclo-F" – 9:18
 "Mythos" (Mats Ståhl) – 1:13

Personnel
Candlemass
Björn Flodkvist – vocals
Mats Ståhl – lead & rhythm guitar
Leif Edling – bass
Jejo Perkovic – drums

Additional personnel
Carl Westholm – synthesizers on ARX/NG 891

Production
Arranged and produced by Candlemass
Recorded and engineered by Candlemass and Bjorn Wallmark
Mixed by Leif Edling, Uffe Östling and Carl Westholm
Mastered by Michael Lind
Cover design by Tomas Arfert

References

External links
"From The 13th Sun" at discogs

Candlemass (band) albums
1999 albums
Music for Nations albums